Generic name may refer to:

 Generic name (biology), the name of a biological genus
 Placeholder name, words that can refer to objects or people whose names are temporarily forgotten, irrelevant, or unknown

Business and law
 Generic brand, consumer products identified by product characteristics rather than brand name
 Generic term, a common name used for a range or class of similar things not protected by trademark
 Generic trademark, a brand name that has become the generic name for a product or service
 Generic name, a brand name designed not to be used as a trademark; see Drug nomenclature#Nonproprietary (generic) names
 Several official nonproprietary or generic naming systems for pharmaceutical substances:
 International Nonproprietary Name (INN)
 United States Adopted Name (USAN)
 Japanese Accepted Name (JAN)
 British Approved Name (BAN)

See also
 Generic drug, a drug marketed under its chemical name without advertising
 Colloquial name, a name or term commonly used to identify something in informal language
 Generic (disambiguation)
 Common name (disambiguation)

Names